This article lists historical urban community sizes based on the estimated populations of selected human settlements from 7000 BC to AD 1875, organized by archaeological periods.

Many of the figures are uncertain, especially in ancient times. Estimating population sizes before censuses were conducted is a difficult task.

Neolithic settlements

Bronze Age

Iron Age

Middle Ages

Early Modern era

See also 
 List of largest cities throughout history (7000 BC – AD 2000)
 List of largest cities, present day
 Estimates of historical world population

Notes

Citations

References

Further reading

External links 
 Interactive Map: Urban Growth (BBC, covering 1955–2015)
 Early Medieval and Byzantine Civilization: Constantine to Crusades

Lists of populated places
Demographic lists
Urban geography
Historical geography
Demographic history